= Parvaliya Sani =

- village
- Location within Madhya Pradesh Location within India
- Coordinates: 23.328535°N 77.3826845°E
- Country: India
- State: Madhya Pradesh
- District: Bhopal
- Tehsil: Huzur
- Elevation: 499 m (1,637 ft)

Population (2011)
  - Total: 874
- Time zone: UTC+5:30 (IST)
- ISO 3166 code: MP-IN
- 2011 census code: 482373

Parvaliya Sani is a village in the Bhopal district of Madhya Pradesh, India. It is located in the Huzur tehsil and the Phanda block.

== Demographics ==
According to the 2011 census of India, Parvaliya Sani has 155 households. The effective literacy rate (i.e. the literacy rate of population excluding children aged 6 and below) is 70.25%.

Demographics (2011 Census)
| | Total | Male | Female |
|---|---|---|---|
| Population | 874 | 458 | 416 |
| Children aged below 6 years | 121 | 64 | 57 |
| Scheduled caste | 52 | 26 | 26 |
| Scheduled tribe | 7 | 3 | 4 |
| Literates | 529 | 326 | 203 |
| Workers (all) | 258 | 233 | 25 |
| Main workers (total) | 254 | 232 | 22 |
| Main workers: Cultivators | 163 | 152 | 11 |
| Main workers: Agricultural labourers | 41 | 39 | 2 |
| Main workers: Household industry workers | 0 | 0 | 0 |
| Main workers: Other | 50 | 41 | 9 |
| Marginal workers (total) | 4 | 1 | 3 |
| Marginal workers: Cultivators | 3 | 1 | 2 |
| Marginal workers: Agricultural labourers | 1 | 0 | 1 |
| Marginal workers: Household industry workers | 0 | 0 | 0 |
| Marginal workers: Others | 0 | 0 | 0 |
| Non-workers | 616 | 225 | 391 |
